Stanley Harold "Stan" Humphries (born August 2, 1969) is an American teacher, farmer, and politician. He represented District 1 in the Kentucky State Senate. He was elected in 2012 to succeed fellow Republican Senator Kenneth W. Winters of Murray serving until January 1, 2021.

Formerly, Humphries served as Judge-Executive of Trigg County, a position to which he was first elected in 2006. He resigned December 31, 2013, following his election to the state senate.

Humphries resides in his native Cadiz, Kentucky. He earned his bachelor's degree in education from Murray State University. Humphries and his wife Kim were married on July 24, 1993. They have three children, Steven (age ), Lydia (age ), and Luke (age ).

References

External links 
 Senate District 1: Senator Stan Humphries (R) at Kentucky Legislature
 Stanley Humphries at Project Vote Smart
 Stan Humphries at Ballotpedia

1969 births
Living people
Republican Party Kentucky state senators
Murray State University alumni
People from Cadiz, Kentucky
21st-century American politicians